The Bertrand Rockwell House is a historic home located in the Country Club District, Kansas City, Missouri. It was designed by architect Mary Rockwell Hook and built in 1908–1909. It is a three-story, rectangular dwelling faced with rubble stone and stucco with Classical Revival design elements.  It features a recessed entry and end porches with Doric order columns.  It was built as a residence for her parents, Mr. and Mrs. Bertrand Rockwell.

It was listed on the National Register of Historic Places in 1983.

References

Houses on the National Register of Historic Places in Missouri
Neoclassical architecture in Missouri
Houses completed in 1909
Houses in Kansas City, Missouri
National Register of Historic Places in Kansas City, Missouri